Protasiewicz (archaic feminine: Protasiewiczowa, archaic maiden surname: Protasiewiczówna, plural: Protasiewiczowie) is a Polish surname, might be Drzewica coat of arms. In other forms as: Protasewicz, Protasevich, Protosevich, Protaszewicz or in Lithuanian: Protasevičius. Notable people with the name include:

Protasiewicz 
 Jacek Protasiewicz (born 1967), Polish politician
 Janet C. Protasiewicz, judge Wisconsin circuit courts
 Piotr Protasiewicz (born 1975), Polish speedway rider

Protasewicz 
 Michał Protasewicz (born 1985), Polish footballer 
 Walerian Protasewicz (c. 1505–1579), bishop of Lutsk (1549–1555) and Vilnius (1555–1579)

Protasevich/ Protosevich 
 Mark Protosevich (born 1961), American screenwriter
 Mikhail Protasevich (born 1971), Belarusian sailor
 Roman Protasevich (born 1995), Belarusian blogger and political activist

Polish-language surnames